Margaret de Jesús (born November 4, 1957 in Brooklyn, New York) is a retired female track and field athlete from Puerto Rico, who competed in the women's 400 metres during her career. She set her personal best (54.23 s) in the event in 1987. Her sole global competition appearance came at the 1984 Summer Olympics where she competed as part of the Puerto Rican women's 4x400 metres relay team. The team did not make the final.
Her twin sister Madeline de Jesús also competed at the 1984 Summer Olympics, and won a number of international medals during her career as a long jumper. Both were born in  Brooklyn, New York and raised in Río Piedras.

Olympic controversy

After Puerto Rico’s Madeline de Jesus came up lame while competing in the long jump, she was unable to run in the 4×400-meter relay at the 1984 Los Angeles Games. Madeline enlisted her identical twin sister, Margaret, as an imposter for a qualifying heat. Margaret ran the second leg of the qualifier, and the team advanced. When the chief coach of the Puerto Rican team learned of the ruse, however, he pulled his team out of the final.

References

1957 births
Living people
Puerto Rican female sprinters
Twin sportspeople
Puerto Rican twins
Olympic track and field athletes of Puerto Rico
Pan American Games competitors for Puerto Rico
Athletes (track and field) at the 1979 Pan American Games
Athletes (track and field) at the 1984 Summer Olympics
University of Puerto Rico alumni
People from Río Piedras, Puerto Rico
Impostors
Central American and Caribbean Games silver medalists for Puerto Rico
Competitors at the 1982 Central American and Caribbean Games
Central American and Caribbean Games medalists in athletics